Van Eetvelde may refer to:

Edmond van Eetvelde (1852–1925), administrator of the Congo Free State.
Miranda Van Eetvelde (born 1959), Belgian politician
Hôtel van Eetvelde, house in Belgium